Zacatecas is a state in North Central Mexico that is divided into 58 municipalities. According to the 2020 Mexican Census, it is the state that has the 7th smallest population with  inhabitants and the 8th largest by land area spanning .

Municipalities in Zacatecas are administratively autonomous of the state according to the 115th article of the 1917 Constitution of Mexico. Every three years, citizens elect a municipal president (Spanish: presidente municipal) by a plurality voting system who heads a concurrently elected municipal council (ayuntamiento) responsible for providing all the public services for their constituents. The municipal council consists of a variable number of trustees and councillors (regidores y síndicos). Municipalities are responsible for public services (such as water and sewerage), street lighting, public safety, traffic, and the maintenance of public parks, gardens and cemeteries. They may also assist the state and federal governments in education, emergency fire and medical services, environmental protection and maintenance of monuments and historical landmarks. Since 1984, they have had the power to collect property taxes and user fees, although more funds are obtained from the state and federal governments than from their own income.

The largest municipality by population in Zacatecas is Fresnillo, with 240,532 residents, and the smallest municipality by population is Susticacán with 1,365 residents. The two newest municipalities are Trancoso, created out of Guadalupe in 2000, and Santa María de la Paz, separated in 2005 from Teúl.

Municipalities

Defunct municipalities  
Sauceda, integrated into Vetagrande in 1918.

Notes

References

                                      

 
Zacatecas